Sebastian Bönig (born 26 August 1981 in Erding) is a  German football coach and former player, who is the coach of Union Berlin. During his playing career, he played for Bayern Munich (A), LR Ahlen, Union Berlin, and BFC Viktoria 1889.

Personal life
His brother, Philipp Bönig, is also a professional footballer.

References

External links 
 

1981 births
Living people
People from Erding
Sportspeople from Upper Bavaria
German footballers
Association football midfielders
2. Bundesliga players
3. Liga players
FC Bayern Munich II players
Rot Weiss Ahlen players
1. FC Union Berlin players
Footballers from Bavaria
1. FC Union Berlin non-playing staff